The Electoral district of Wakehurst is an electoral district of the Legislative Assembly in the Australian state of New South Wales. It covers a significant part of Sydney's Northern Beaches as well as parts of the Forest District. Created in 1962, it has been won by the Liberal Party at all but two elections over the last half-century.

History
Created in 1962, Wakehurst was named in honour of the popular long-serving Governor of New South Wales from 1937 to 1946, Lord Wakehurst. It was held by the Liberal Party from its creation until the 1978 election, when it was won by the Labor Party as part of the first Wranslide. Although the seat is ancestrally Liberal, Labor held the seat until the 1984 election, when the Liberals retook the seat.

The seat was first won in 1962 by Dick Healey of the Liberal Party. He moved to the new seat of Davidson in 1971. He served as a minister in the Coalition state government from 1973 to 1976, and retired in 1981. Wakehurst was won in 1971 by Allan Viney. He held the seat until his defeat in 1978 by the ALP's Tom Webster. Webster was re-elected at the 1981 election but was defeated in 1984 by Liberal candidate John Booth. Booth held the seat until 1991, when he lost preselection to current member Brad Hazzard. Hazzard joined the Coalition shadow frontbench after the 1995 election, and served as a minister in the O'Farrell, Baird, Berejiklian and Perrottet governments.

Members for Wakehurst

Election results

References

External links 

Wakehurst
1962 establishments in Australia
Constituencies established in 1962
Northern Beaches